The 1985 Men's World Weightlifting Championships were held in Södertälje, Sweden from August 23 to September 1, 1985. There were 195 men in action from 38 nations.

Medal summary

Medal table
Ranking by Big (Total result) medals 

Ranking by all medals: Big (Total result) and Small (Snatch and Clean & Jerk)

References
Results (Sport 123)
Weightlifting World Championships Seniors Statistics

External links
International Weightlifting Federation

World Weightlifting Championships
World Weightlifting Championships
World Weightlifting Championships
International weightlifting competitions hosted by Sweden